Deshabandu Kameradin Susanthika Jayasinghe (Tamil: சுசந்திகா ஜயசிங்ஹ, born December 17, 1975) is a Sri Lankan retired sprinter, who specialized in the 100 and 200 metres. She won the Olympic silver medal for the 200m event in the 2000 Summer Olympics in Sydney, the second Sri Lankan to win an Olympic medal after Duncan White and the first Asian woman to win an Olympic or World Championship medal in a sprint event. She is also the only Asian athlete to have claimed an Olympic medal in sprint events. She is also the first and only Sri Lankan to win a medal at the World Athletics Championships. Her silver medal achievement at the 2000 Sydney Olympics also stood as the only Olympic medal for a South Asian in athletics event for 21 years before Neeraj Chopra's gold medal achievement at the 2020 Summer Olympics. She is fondly nicknamed as the Asian Black Mare. She has represented Sri Lanka at the Olympics on three occasions in 1996, 2000 and 2008. She is considered one of the most decorated sprinters in Sri Lanka. However, she is also a deemed as a controversial figure in Sri Lanka.

She became a victim of politics during the peak of her career as many politicians and sports officials attempted to take credit for her medal achievements despite not supporting her prior to competing at the events. She was embroiled in political controversies including a series of false doping allegations, standoff with politicians, seven year old murder trials against her former spouse and sexual harassment. She was also sidelined for major part of her career due to injury concerns and also endured a troubled marriage life.

Early years
Jayasinghe was born in Ethnawala, Warakapola, Uduwaka, Sri Lanka. She was born as the fifth and youngest child in her family. She was brought up in a poor family in a small village 60 kilometres north of Colombo, where running spikes cost more than the average month's wage, she had no access to proper sports equipment or coaches.

Her father who served as a bus driver at the Ceylon Transport Board had eventually lost his job by the time she was born. The burden fell on the shoulders of her mother who cut rubber trees to run the family. Later on Susanthika too lent a helping hand to her family by rolling beedi. She earned around Rs. 22.50 by selling about 15000 beedis within four days. Despite the financial tussles, she pursued her primary education at the Uduwaka Junior School. She later switched to Athnawala Maha Vidyalaya to continue her studies.

She was encouraged to take up athletics by an army officer who watched her closely when she was running in an inter-school competition at the age of 16. The army officer who watched her event as a spectator recommended her to join Sri Lanka Army soon after completing the school education. She agreed his offer and signed up as a volunteer recruit and also trained hard in athletics while being attached with the army.

She enlisted in the Sri Lanka Army Volunteer Force to pursue her athletic career, and was attached to the 3rd Battalion, Sri Lanka Army Women's Corps (SLAWC) as a Private. In 1994, she competed in the All Island Athletic Championship from a team from the SLAWC and won the best player trophy.

Professional athletics career 
She rose to prominence at the age of 18 after claiming a gold in 200m and a silver in 100m events during the 1994 Asian Junior Championships which was held in Jakarta.

She thereafter joined the Sri Lankan national athletic squad competing in the 1994 Asian Games. She made her South Asian Games debut at the age of 15 during the 1995 edition and claimed gold medals in 100m and 200m sprint events. She also got due recognition for her silver medal performances in 100m events at the Australian Open and Taipei Open in 1995.

She made her maiden Olympic appearance at the age of 20 representing Sri Lanka at the 1996 Summer Olympics and competed in the women's 100m event. She clinched silver medal in the women's 200m race at the 1997 World Championships. She also became the first Sri Lankan to win a medal at the World Athletics Championships.

With no support from her national athletics association, she had to go heavily into debt to reach the Olympics. She faced severe financial constraints and mental challenges before her journey to the 2000 Sydney Olympics. She even auctioned and sold out all her trophies in order to raise adequate funds to buy tickets with the intention of training in the USA prior to the Sydney Olympics.

She qualified to take part at the 2000 Summer Olympics after winning the 100m sprint event at the National Athletics Championships. Notably, she competed in her first track event at the home soil after a gap of 2 years as she was sidelined for several months after sustaining a hamstring injury.

Just a month prior to the scheduled Olympic event, she bettered her own national record in 200m sprint event twice within just 2 days at the 25th National Sports Festival in August 2000. She also went onto claim gold medals in both 100m and 200m events at the 2000 National Sports Festival in her comeback return to the field after successfully recovering from a hamstring injury which ruled her out for several months.

In the women's 200 meters at the 2000 Summer Olympics, she finished behind Marion Jones and Pauline Davis-Thompson to win the bronze medal and became Sri Lanka's first Olympic medalist since 1948. On October 5, 2007, Jones admitted to having taken performance-enhancing drugs prior to the Olympics, and Jayasinghe was later awarded the silver medal.

Jayasinghe was suspended from competition in April 1998 for failing a drug test that she claimed was rigged because of her political beliefs and a falling out with a Sports Ministry official. She was later cleared of the offense. During a press conference for the women's 200m medalists at the 2000 Olympics, when asked whether her country would be proud of her, she said in a quiet voice:

"I can't explain. You wouldn't understand. They give me, trouble, trouble, trouble. I give them bronze medal. It'll make them sad... It was trouble with me. Doping and sexual harassment."She alleged during a live segment on Lasantha Wickrematunge's show that the minister S. B. Dissanayake had attempted to sexually harass her. Later, Jayasinghe claimed that she did not specifically accuse Minister Dissanayaka. The television program where Susie made her allegations against S. B. Dissanayake which was aired on TNL TV was suspended after the involvement of powerful politicians.

She then went on to speak of officials coming to her house, giving her a drug test and refusing to seal the urine specimen with her watching. She refused to sign the release. Later they told her she had tested positive for nandrolone. By the time she was cleared, she was no longer welcome by her country's sporting establishment.

After returning home with her Olympic medal she was attacked by a male athlete because, she believed, she had been supporting former government members in an election campaign. It was believed that she reportedly wore a yellow ribbon around her wrist during the 2000 Summer Olympics women's 200m final and also during the medal ceremony in a show of support for a political movement. The Government of Sri Lanka failed to deliver an hero's welcome when she returned from Sydney with her bronze medal and instead the politicians of the government made scathing attack on her.

However, after her medal achievement she was supported by a national fundraising drive in her homeland. She visited Los Angeles to train with Nagalingam Ethirveerasingam (Asian Games Gold Medalist in the high jump in 1958, and two time Olympian in the high jump, in 1952 and 1956). In May 2001, she also underwent a four-month training stint from American coach Tony Campbell before competing at the 2001 World Athletics Championships.

She was the flag bearer for Sri Lanka during the opening ceremony of the 2004 Summer Olympics. She was slated to be on the entry list for the women's 100 metres but a fracture in her right leg caused her to pull out from the competition. She continued to struggle with injury concerns throughout 2005 and returned to action in 2006. On her comeback return she claimed gold medal in women's 200m event at the 2006 South Asian Games.

Shortly thereafter, she won gold medals in the 100 m and 200 m at the 2007 Asian Athletics Championships in Jordan and a bronze medal in the 200 m race at the 2007 IAAF World Championships. It was her first World Championship medal in 10 years. On 13 August 2007 she was ranked by the IAAF as 18th in the world for the 100 m sprint and 20th in the world for the 200 m sprint.

She also appeared as the flagbearer for Sri Lanka in both the opening and closing ceremonies of the 2008 Summer Olympics. She became the first and only Sri Lankan athlete to have appeared as a flagbearer in two Olympic events.

On February 5, 2009, Jayasinghe announced her retirement from sports in order to focus on becoming a mother. On March 31, 2009, she gave birth to a baby boy.

In November 2010, she announced her plan to return to competition.

Honours 
She was awarded the Most Outstanding Sportswoman of the Year in 2008 by the then Sri Lankan President Mahinda Rajapakse.

She was conferred with the prestigious Deshabandu title during the 2017 Sri Lankan national honours by the then President Maithripala Sirisena.

Post-sports career 
Jayasinghe contested the 2010 general election from the Kegalle district from the United People's Freedom Alliance, however failed to secure a seat. In 2016, she was appointed as an paid adviser in the Ministry of Sports for selecting and training prospective track athletes. In June 2017, she attempted to sell her silver medal due to suspension of her Sports Ministry pay. She accused the state and government officials of continuously neglecting her despite her Olympic achievement. She has also been a vocal critic of Sri Lanka Athletics Federation administrators over the years for the lackluster performances by Sri Lanka in athletics.

She accompanied the Sri Lankan Athletics contingent for the 2019 South Asian Games where unexpectedly Sri Lanka eclipsed the medal tally of India in athletics events during the Kathmandu South Asian Games and it also marked the first instance of Sri Lanka with a higher medal achievement than India in athletics at a South Asian Games competition after a gap of 15 years.

Personal life 
She married her sports trainer Dhammika Nandakumara on 17 November 2000 at the Ambepussa Rest House. Susanthika was engaged to him in 1994 and the official wedding was arranged for them after a gap of six years following the silver medal achievement for her.

In 2016, she was admitted to the Intensive Care Unit of the Diyatalawa Hospital after being diagnosed with dengue. In 2016, her husband was arrested for assaulting her. She was hospitalised and was discharged soon after. She has one son and one daughter.

On 14 September 2021, she along with her two children were tested positive for COVID-19 after undergoing a PCR test.

Personal bests

Achievements

See also
Duncan White
Sriyantha Dissanayake
Nagalingam Ethirveerasingam

Notes

External links
 

1975 births
Living people
People from Kegalle District
Sri Lankan female sprinters
Olympic athletes of Sri Lanka
Olympic silver medalists for Sri Lanka
Athletes (track and field) at the 2000 Summer Olympics
Athletes (track and field) at the 2008 Summer Olympics
Commonwealth Games competitors for Sri Lanka
Athletes (track and field) at the 2002 Commonwealth Games
World Athletics Championships medalists
World Athletics Championships athletes for Sri Lanka
Asian Games medalists in athletics (track and field)
Athletes (track and field) at the 1994 Asian Games
Athletes (track and field) at the 1998 Asian Games
Athletes (track and field) at the 2002 Asian Games
Athletes (track and field) at the 2006 Asian Games
Sinhalese sportspeople
Sri Lankan Buddhists
Medalists at the 2000 Summer Olympics
Asian Games gold medalists for Sri Lanka
Asian Games silver medalists for Sri Lanka
Asian Games bronze medalists for Sri Lanka
Olympic silver medalists in athletics (track and field)
Medalists at the 1994 Asian Games
Medalists at the 2002 Asian Games
Medalists at the 2006 Asian Games
Sri Lanka Army Women's Corps soldiers
Deshabandu
Olympic female sprinters